Heinz Klingenberg (born 9 October 1934) is a German philologist who specializes in Old Norse studies.

Biography
Heinz Klingenberg was born in Nauen, Germany on 9 October 1934. He received his Ph.D. at the University of Freiburg in 1959, where he completed his habilitation in 1970. He was appointed an associate professor there in 1973. From 1979 until his retirement in 2000, Klingenberg was Professor of Scandinavian Studies at the University of Freiburg.

See also
 Heinrich Beck
 Rudolf Simek
 Robert Nedoma
 Klaus Böldl

Selected works
 Festschrift Siegfried Gutenbrunner. 1972
 Runenschrift, Schriftdenken, Runeninschriften. 1973
 Edda, Sammlung und Dichtung. 1974
 Festschrift Otmar Werner. 1997
 Heidnisches Altertum und nordisches Mittelalter. Strukturbildende Perspektiven des Snorri Sturluson. 1999

Sources
 Kürschners Deutscher Gelehrten-Kalender 2013. Bio- bibliographisches Verzeichnis deutschsprachiger Wissenschaftler der Gegenwart. 2. Teilband, De Gruyter, Berlin/Boston (25. Ausgabe) 2013, . (Geistes- und Sozialwissenschaften)
 Bela Brogyanyi (Hrsg.): Germanisches Altertum und christliches Mittelalter. Festschrift für Heinz Klingenberg zum 65. Geburtstag. Kovač, Hamburg 2002, 

1934 births
German male non-fiction writers
German philologists
Germanic studies scholars
Living people
Old Norse studies scholars
Runologists
University of Freiburg alumni
Academic staff of the University of Freiburg
Writers on Germanic paganism